Go Ara (born February 11, 1990) is a South Korean actress and model. She is best known for starring in the television series Sharp (2003), Heading to the Ground (2009), Reply 1994 (2013), You're All Surrounded (2014), Hwarang: The Poet Warrior Youth (2016–17), Black (2017), Ms. Hammurabi (2018), Haechi (2019), and  Do Do Sol Sol La La Sol (2020).

Early life and training
Go was born in Jinju, South Gyeongsang, South Korea. At a young age, she constantly moved around Korea because her father was a soldier. When she was in junior high, she was recommended by a friend to audition for the talent agency SM Entertainment. In 2003, she became the winner of the SM Entertainment Teen Model Contest.

Career

2003–2012: Beginnings and rising popularity
Go was chosen to play the female lead, Lee Ok-rim, in the 2003 KBS teen drama Sharp. Her role as an ambitious and confident middle school girl catapulted her to instant stardom. She reprised her role in the sequel Sharp 2.

Go next starred in the 2006 SBS melodrama Snow Flower alongside Kim Hee-ae. Her portrayal of the rebellious and ambitious Yoo Da-mi won her acting recognition at the Baeksang Arts Awards.

Go's first film was the big-budget Japanese movie Genghis Khan: To the Ends of the Earth and Sea, which was released in Japan in March 2007. She played Khulan, the mistress of Genghis Khan, after being picked from more than 40,000 auditions. Go was then cast in another Japanese film, Dance Subaru due to her fluency in the language.

In 2008, she was cast in the MBC drama Who Are You? opposite Yoon Kye-sang. Despite low ratings in Korea, the body swap comedy drew in international fans, increasing her Korean Wave profile. This led to an appearance in the Japanese television drama Karei naru Spy.

In 2009, she was cast in MBC's romantic comedy Heading to the Ground with idol singer Jung Yunho from DBSK.

In 2012, Go made her domestic film debut in sports film Pacemaker, where she gained 5 kg weight to portray a pole vaulter representing South Korea. She then displayed her singing skills in the 2012 multicultural film Papa, with Park Yong-woo. Go drew attention for her singing and dancing abilities, fluent English and acting performance in the film.

2013–present: Career resurgence
Go's popularity further rose through the nostalgic campus drama Reply 1994 (2013). In order to portray Sung Na-jung, she cut her hair short, and gained 18 lbs. While many doubted her casting when it was first announced, Go's acting later nabbed praise both critically and with viewers. For her performance, Go received Best Actress nominations in the Baeksang Art Awards and APAN Star Awards. She next starred as the sole female rookie detective in the 2014 police drama You're All Surrounded, alongside Lee Seung-gi and Cha Seung-won.

In 2015, Go returned to the big screen alongside Yoo Seung-ho in joseon-era romance film, The Magician, where she plays a princess who finds love with a circus magician. This was followed by a leading role in Phantom Detective, a neo-noir action flick starring Lee Je-hoon as the titular Hong Gil-dong.

In 2016, Go starred as the female lead opposite Park Seo-joon in youth historical drama Hwarang: The Poet Warrior Youth. The same year, she left SM Entertainment after 13 years and signed with newly formed management agency Artist Company in January 2017.
She then starred in the fantasy thriller drama Black alongside Song Seung-heon, playing a woman who can foresee death.

In 2018, Go starred in the legal drama Ms. Hammurabi alongside Kim Myung-soo, playing a passionate rookie judge. The series was well-received for its honest depiction of adversities in modern-day Korean society; and Go was complimented for her acting.

In 2019, Go starred in the historical action drama Haechi, playing a detective who is well versed in both martial arts and foreign languages.

In 2020, Go starred in the music romance drama Do Do Sol Sol La La Sol as a pianist who hits rock bottom following her family’s downfall alongside 
Lee Jae-wook.

In January 2023, Go signed with King Kong by Starship.

Personal life
On March 7, 2019, Go's agency reported that during the filming of Haechi Go ruptured her Anterior talofibular ligament which resulted in her being hospitalised.

Filmography

Film

Television series

Music video appearances

Discography

Ambassadorship

Awards and nominations

References

External links
 
 

People from Jinju
South Korean film actresses
South Korean television actresses
South Korean female models
1990 births
Chung-Ang University alumni
Living people